Histidine (symbol His or H) is an essential amino acid that is used in the biosynthesis of proteins. It contains an α-amino group (which is in the protonated –NH3+ form under biological conditions), a carboxylic acid group (which is in the deprotonated –COO− form under biological conditions), and an imidazole side chain (which is partially protonated), classifying it as a positively charged amino acid at physiological pH. Initially thought essential only for infants, it has now been shown in longer-term studies to be essential for adults also. It is encoded by the codons CAU and CAC.

Histidine was first isolated by Albrecht Kossel and Sven Gustaf Hedin in 1896. It is also a precursor to histamine, a vital inflammatory agent in immune responses. The acyl radical is histidyl.

Properties of the imidazole side chain
The conjugate acid (protonated form) of the imidazole side chain in histidine has a pKa of approximately 6.0.  Thus, below a pH of 6, the imidazole ring is mostly protonated (as described by the Henderson–Hasselbalch equation).  The resulting imidazolium ring bears two NH bonds and has a positive charge. The positive charge is equally distributed between both nitrogens and can be represented with two equally important resonance structures. Sometimes, the symbol Hip is used for this protonated form instead of the usual His. Above pH 6, one of the two protons is lost.  The remaining proton of the imidazole ring can reside on either nitrogen, giving rise to what are known as the N1-H or N3-H tautomers. The N3-H tautomer is shown in the figure above. In the N1-H tautomer, the NH is nearer the backbone. These neutral tautomers, also referred to as Nδ and Nε, are sometimes referred to with symbols Hid and Hie, respectively. The imidazole/imidazolium ring of histidine is aromatic at all pH values.

The acid-base properties of the imidazole side chain are relevant to the catalytic mechanism of many enzymes. In catalytic triads, the basic nitrogen of histidine abstracts a proton from serine, threonine, or cysteine to activate it as a nucleophile. In a histidine proton shuttle, histidine is used to quickly shuttle protons. It can do this by abstracting a proton with its basic nitrogen to make a positively charged intermediate and then use another molecule, a buffer, to extract the proton from its acidic nitrogen. In carbonic anhydrases, a histidine proton shuttle is utilized to rapidly shuttle protons away from a zinc-bound water molecule to quickly regenerate the active form of the enzyme. In helices E and F of haemoglobin, histidine influences binding of dioxygen as well as carbon monoxide.  This interaction enhances the affinity of Fe(II) for O2 but destabilizes the binding of CO, which binds only 200 times stronger in haemoglobin, compared to 20,000 times stronger in free haem.

The tautomerism and acid-base properties of the imidazole side chain has been characterized by 15N NMR spectroscopy. The two 15N chemical shifts are similar (about 200 ppm, relative to nitric acid on the sigma scale, on which increased shielding corresponds to increased chemical shift).  NMR spectral measurements shows that the chemical shift of N1-H drops slightly, whereas the chemical shift of N3-H drops considerably (about 190 vs. 145 ppm).  This change indicates that the N1-H tautomer is preferred, possibly due to hydrogen bonding to the neighboring ammonium.  The shielding at N3 is substantially reduced due to the second-order paramagnetic effect, which involves a symmetry-allowed interaction between the nitrogen lone pair and the excited π* states of the aromatic ring.  At pH > 9, the chemical shifts of N1 and N3 are approximately 185 and 170 ppm.

Ligand

Histidine forms complexes with many metal ions. The imidazole sidechain of the histidine residue commonly serves as a ligand in metalloproteins. One example is the axial base attached to Fe in myoglobin and hemoglobin. Poly-histidine tags (of six or more consecutive H residues) are utilized for protein purification by binding to columns with nickel or cobalt, with micromolar affinity. Natural poly-histidine peptides, found in the venom of the viper Atheris squamigera have been shown to bind Zn(2+), Ni(2+) and Cu(2+) and affect the function of venom metalloproteases.

Metabolism

Biosynthesis 

-Histidine is an essential amino acid that is not synthesized de novo in humans. Humans and other animals must ingest histidine or histidine-containing proteins. The biosynthesis of histidine has been widely studied in prokaryotes such as E. coli. Histidine synthesis in E. coli involves eight gene products (His1, 2, 3, 4, 5, 6, 7, and 8) and it occurs in ten steps. This is possible because a single gene product has the ability to catalyze more than one reaction. For example, as shown in the pathway, His4 catalyzes 4 different steps in the pathway.

Histidine is synthesized from phosphoribosyl pyrophosphate (PRPP), which is made from ribose-5-phosphate by ribose-phosphate diphosphokinase in the pentose phosphate pathway. The first reaction of histidine biosynthesis is the condensation of PRPP and adenosine triphosphate (ATP) by the enzyme ATP-phosphoribosyl transferase. ATP-phosphoribosyl transferase is indicated by His1 in the image. His4 gene product then hydrolyzes the product of the condensation, phosphoribosyl-ATP, producing phosphoribosyl-AMP (PRAMP), which is an irreversible step. His4 then catalyzes the formation of phosphoribosylformiminoAICAR-phosphate, which is then converted to phosphoribulosylformimino-AICAR-P by the His6 gene product. His7 splits phosphoribulosylformimino-AICAR-P to form -erythro-imidazole-glycerol-phosphate. After, His3 forms imidazole acetol-phosphate releasing water. His5 then makes -histidinol-phosphate, which is then hydrolyzed by His2 making histidinol. His4 catalyzes the oxidation of -histidinol to form -histidinal, an amino aldehyde. In the last step, -histidinal is converted to -histidine.

Just like animals and microorganisms, plants need histidine for their growth and development. Microorganisms and plants are similar in that they can synthesize histidine. Both synthesize histidine from the biochemical intermediate phosphoribosyl pyrophosphate. In general, the histidine biosynthesis is very similar in plants and microorganisms.

Regulation of biosynthesis 
This pathway requires energy in order to occur therefore, the presence of ATP activates the first enzyme of the pathway, ATP-phosphoribosyl transferase (shown as His1 in the image on the right). ATP-phosphoribosyl transferase is the rate determining enzyme, which is regulated through feedback inhibition meaning that it is inhibited in the presence of the product, histidine.

Degradation 
Histidine is one of the amino acids that can be converted to intermediates of the tricarboxylic acid (TCA) cycle (also known as the citric acid cycle). Histidine, along with other amino acids such as proline and arginine, takes part in deamination, a process in which its amino group is removed. In prokaryotes, histidine is first converted to urocanate by histidase. Then, urocanase converts urocanate to 4-imidazolone-5-propionate. Imidazolonepropionase catalyzes the reaction to form formiminoglutamate (FIGLU) from 4-imidazolone-5-propionate. The formimino group is transferred to tetrahydrofolate, and the remaining five carbons form glutamate. Overall, these reactions result in the formation of glutamate and ammonia. Glutamate can then be deaminated by glutamate dehydrogenase or transaminated to form α-ketoglutarate.

Conversion to other biologically active amines 
 The histidine amino acid is a precursor for histamine, an amine produced in the body necessary for inflammation. 
 The enzyme histidine ammonia-lyase converts histidine into ammonia and urocanic acid. A deficiency in this enzyme is present in the rare metabolic disorder histidinemia, producing urocanic aciduria as a key diagnostic finding.
 Histidine can be converted to 3-methylhistidine, which serves as a biomarker for skeletal muscle damage, by certain methyltransferase enzymes. 
 Histidine is also a precursor for carnosine biosynthesis, which is a dipeptide found in skeletal muscle.
 In Actinomycetota and filamentous fungi, such as Neurospora crassa, histidine can be converted into the antioxidant ergothioneine.

Requirements
The Food and Nutrition Board (FNB) of the U.S. Institute of Medicine set Recommended Dietary Allowances (RDAs) for essential amino acids in 2002. For histidine, for adults 19 years and older, 14 mg/kg body weight/day. Supplemental histidine is being investigated for use in a variety of different conditions, including neurological disorders, atopic dermatitis, metabolic syndrome, diabetes, uraemic anaemia, ulcers, inflammatory bowel diseases, malignancies, and muscle performance during strenuous exercise.

See also 
Carnosinemia
Beta-Alanine
Diphthamide
Pauly reaction

References

External links 
Histidine MS Spectrum

Proteinogenic amino acids
Basic amino acids
Essential amino acids
Imidazoles
Carbonic anhydrase activators